These writers are notable authors of children's literature with some of their most famous works.



A

Verna Aardema (1911–2001) – Why Mosquitoes Buzz in People's Ears
Rafael Ábalos (born 1956) – Grimpow
Jacob Abbott (1803–1879) – Rollo series, Cousin Lucy's Conversations, Bruno
Tony Abbott (born 1952) – The Secrets of Droon, Danger Guys
Deborah Abela (born 1966) – Max Remy Superspy, Grimsdon
Joan Abelove (born 1945) – Go and Come Back
Chris van Abkoude (1880–1960) – Pietje Bell series, Little Crumb
Socorro Acioli (born 1975) – The Ghost Dancer
Richard Adams (1920–2016) – Watership Down
Jean Adamson (born 1928) – Topsy and Tim
C. S. Adler (born 1932) – Magic of the Glits, Ghost Brother
David A. Adler (born 1947) – Cam Jansen series, The Babe and I
Aesop (6th century BCE) – Fables
Joan Aiken (1924–2004) – The Wolves of Willoughby Chase, Arabel and Mortimer series, A Necklace of Raindrops
Ahmad Akbarpour (born 1970) – If I Were a Pilot
Vivien Alcock (1924–2003) – The Haunting of Cassie Palmer
Louisa May Alcott (1832–1888) – Little Women, The Brownie and the Princess
Kwame Alexander (born 1958) – The Crossover
Lloyd Alexander (1924–2007) – The Chronicles of Prydain series, Westmark trilogy
Sue Alexander (1933–2008) – Nadia the Willful
Horatio Alger, Jr. (1832–1899) – Ragged Dick
Mabel Esther Allan (1915–1998) – Over the Sea to School, Ballet for Drina, The Ballet Family
David Almond (born 1951) – Skellig, Heaven Eyes, Kit's Wilderness
Joseph Alexander Altsheler (1862–1919) – The Young Trailers series, The Civil War series
Julia Alvarez (born 1950) – Tia Lola series
Hans Christian Andersen (1805–1875) – "The Snow Queen", "The Little Mermaid", "The Ugly Duckling", "The Emperor's New Clothes", "The Princess and the Pea", "Thumbelina"
Lena Anderson (born 1939) – Tea for Ten, Tick-Tock
Verily Anderson (1915–2010) – Brownie series
Sam Angus (born 1967) – Soldier Dog, The House on Hummingbird Island
Charlotte Anley (1796–1893) – Influence: A Moral Tale for Young People (1822)
K. A. Applegate (born 1956) – Animorphs, Remnants, Everworld series, The One and Only Ivan
Victor Appleton (Stratemeyer house pseudonym from 1910) – Tom Swift series
Philip Ardagh (born 1961) – Eddie Dickens series, Unlikely Exploits series
Edward Ardizzone (1900–1979) – Tim All Alone, Tim and the Brave Sea Captain (self-illustrated)
Laura Adams Armer (1874–1963) – Waterless Mountain
William H. Armstrong (1914–1999) – Sounder
Elizabeth Arnold (born 1944) – The Parsley Parcel
Tedd Arnold (born 1949) – No Jumping on the Bed!, Parts
Ruth M. Arthur (1905–1979) – A Candle in Her Room, Portrait of Margarita, Requiem for a Princess
Frank Asch (born 1946) – I Can Blink
Bernard Ashley (born 1935) – The Trouble with Donovan Croft, Dodgem, Little Soldier
Ros Asquith (living) – Teenage Worrier series
M. E. Atkinson (1899–1974) – August Adventure, Smugglers' Gap, Mystery Manor
Margaret Atwood (born 1939) – Up in the Tree, Princess Prunella and the Purple Peanut, Wandering Wenda and Widow Wallop's Wunderground Washery 
Cécile Aubry (1928–2010) – Belle et Sébastien
Malayath Appunni (born 1943) – Kambili Kuppayam
Martin Auer (born 1951) – Now, Now, Markus, The Blue Boy
Steve Augarde (born 1950) – The Various, Celandine
Jonathan Auxier (born 1981) – The Night Gardener, Sweep: The Story of a Girl and Her Monster
Esther Averill (1902–1992) – The Cat Club, The Fire Cat
Gillian Avery (1926–2016) – The Warden's Niece, The Elephant War, A Likely Lad
Harold Avery (1869–1943) – The Triple Alliance, Play the Game
Avi (born 1937) – Crispin: The Cross of Lead, The True Confessions of Charlotte Doyle
Christopher Awdry (born 1940) – The Railway Series #27–40 (Thomas the Tank Engine stories)
Wilbert Awdry (1911–1997) – The Railway Series #1–26 (Thomas the Tank Engine stories)

B

Natalie Babbitt (1932–2016) – Tuck Everlasting, Knee-Knock Rise, The Search for Delicious
Maria Baciu (born 1942) – Ghetuţele copilăriei
Enid Bagnold (1889–1981) – National Velvet
Bob Balaban (born 1945) – McGrowl series
R. M. Ballantyne (1825–1894) – The Coral Island
Blue Balliett (born 1955) – Chasing Vermeer, The Wright 3, The Calder Game
Lynne Reid Banks (born 1929) – The Indian in the Cupboard series
Helen Bannerman (1862–1946) – Little Black Sambo
Shirley Barber (born 1935) – The Tale of Martha B. Rabbit, A Wedding in Fairyland
Ralph Henry Barbour (1870–1944) – The Half Back, For the Honor of the School, Tom, Dick and Harriet
Clive Barker (born 1952) – The Thief of Always
Joyce Barkhouse (1913–2012) – Pit Pony 
Jill Barklem (1951–2017) – Brambly Hedge
Steve Barlow  and Steve Skidmore – Outernet series
Kitty Barne (1883–1961) – She Shall Have Music,  Family Footlights, Visitors from London, Rosina Copper
Kelly Barnhill (living) – The Girl Who Drank the Moon
J. M. Barrie (1860–1937) – Peter Pan
T. A. Barron (born 1952) – The Lost Years of Merlin
Dave Barry (born 1947) – Peter and the Starcatchers series
Margaret Stuart Barry (born 1927) – Simon and the Witch
Graeme Base (born 1958) – Animalia
L. Frank Baum (1856–1919) – The Wonderful Wizard of Oz series
Hans Baumann (1914–1988) – Sons of the Steppe, I Marched with Hannibal
Nina Bawden (1925–2012) – Carrie's War, The Witch's Daughter, The Peppermint Pig
"BB" (D. J. Watkins-Pitchford) (1905–1990) – The Little Grey Men, Down the Bright Stream, Bill Badger and the Pirates
S. G. Hulme Beaman (1887–1932) – Toytown stories
Jerome Beatty Jr (1916–2002) – Matthew Looney space series
Aaron Becker (born 1974) – Journey, Quest, Return
Thea Beckman (1923–2004) – Crusade in Jeans, Children of Mother Earth series
Frank Beddor – The Looking Glass Wars series
John Bellairs (1938–1991) – The House with a Clock in Its Walls
Hilaire Belloc (1870–1953) – Cautionary Tales for Children, The Bad Child's Book of Beasts, More Beasts for Worse Children
Ludwig Bemelmans (1898–1962) – Madeline
Derek Benz (born 1971) – Grey Griffins
Berechiah ha-Nakdan (12th – 13th century) – Mishle Shualim, Fables of a Jewish Aesop
Stan and Jan Berenstain (1923–2005 and 1923–2012) – The Berenstain Bears series
Elisabeth Beresford (1928–2010) – The Wombles, Awkward Magic
Leila Berg (1917–2012) – Nippers series
Paul Berna (1908–1994) – A Hundred Million Francs, The Street Musician, Flood Warning
Elsa Beskow (1874–1953)
Luc Besson (born 1958) – Arthur and the Minimoys series
Vitaly Bianki (1894–1959) – Whose Nose is Better?
David Biedrzycki (born 1955) – Ace Lacewing: Bug Detective, Me and My Dragon, Santa Retires
Paul Biegel (1925–2006) – The King of the Copper Mountains, The Little Captain, The Elephant Party
Margaret Biggs (born 1929) – Melling School series
Franny Billingsley (born 1954) – Well Wished, Big Bad Bunny
Claire Huchet Bishop (1899–1993) – The Five Chinese Brothers, All Alone, The Big Loop
Christina Björk (born 1938) – Linnea in Monet's Garden
Holly Black (born 1971) – The Spiderwick Chronicles, Beyond the Spiderwick Chronicles, Tithe, Valiant
Malorie Blackman (born 1962) – Noughts & Crosses, Pig Heart Boy, Cloud Busting
Clair Blank (1915–1965) – Beverly Gray mystery series
Judy Blume (born 1938) – Are You There, God? It's Me, Margaret, Fudge series
Enid Blyton (1897–1968) – Noddy series, The Famous Five series, The Secret Seven series, The Faraway Tree series, Sunny Stories magazine
Godfried Bomans (1913–1971) – Eric in the Land of the Insects, The Wily Wizard and the Wicked Witch, Pim, Frits en Ida 
Michael Bond (1926–2017) – Paddington Bear series
Nancy Bond (born 1945) – A String in the Harp
Ruskin Bond (born 1934) – The Room on the Roof, The Blue Umbrella, Angry River
Veronica Bonilla (born 1962) – The Platanario series, Magic Dream
Arna Bontemps (1902–1970) – Sad-Faced Boy, Lonesome Boy, Mr. Kelso's Lion
Lucy M. Boston (1892–1990) – Green Knowe series
J. Allan Bosworth (1925–1990) – White Water, Still Water, All the Dark Places
Marie Marguerite Bouvet (1865–1915) – Sweet William, Little Marjorie's Love Story, Prince Tip–Top
Chris Bradford (born 1974) – Young Samurai series

Kimberly Brubaker Bradley (born 1967) – The War That Saved My Life
Tony Bradman (born 1954) – Dilly the Dinosaur series
Gillian Bradshaw (born 1956) – The Dragon and the Thief, The Land of Gold, Beyond the North Wind
Christianna Brand (1907–1988) – Nurse Matilda series (adapted as Nanny McPhee)
Ann Brashares (born 1967) – The Sisterhood of the Traveling Pants series
Angela Brazil (1868–1947) – The Nicest Girl in the School, For the Sake of the School, The Jolliest Term on Record
Petronella Breinburg (1931–2019) – My Brother Sean, Sally-Ann's Umbrella
Elinor Brent-Dyer (1894–1969) – Chalet School series
Jan Brett (born 1949) – Trouble with Trolls
Thomas Brezina (born 1963) – The Knickerbocker Gang, Tom Turbo
Rae Bridgman – The MiddleGate Books: The Serpent's Spell, Amber Ambrosia, Fish & Sphinx
Katharine Mary Briggs (1898–1980) – Hobberdy Dick, Kate Crackernuts
Robert Bright (1902–1988) – Georgie
Carol Ryrie Brink (1895–1981) – Caddie Woodlawn, Baby Island
Hesba Fay Brinsmead (1922–2003) – Pastures of the Blue Crane, Longtime Dreaming
Ivana Brlić-Mažuranić (1874–1938) – The Marvelous Adventures and Misadventures of Hlapić the Apprentice, Tales of Long Ago
Frances Freeling Broderip (1830–1878) – Funny Fables for Little Folks
Lauren Brooke – Heartland series, Chestnut Hill series
Walter R. Brooks (1886–1958) – Freddy the Pig series
Marc Brown (born 1946) – Arthur series
Marcia Brown (1918–2015) – Puss in Boots
Margaret Wise Brown (1910–1952) – Goodnight Moon, The Runaway Bunny
Pamela Brown (1924–1989) – The Swish of the Curtain
Frances Browne (1816–1879) – Granny's Wonderful Chair
Jean de Brunhoff (1899–1937) – Babar the Elephant series
Ashley Bryan (1923–2022) – Freedom Over Me, Sing to the Sun
Jan Brzechwa (1900–1966) – Pan Kleks series, and many poems for children
Anthony Buckeridge (1912–2004) – Jennings school stories
Maria Elizabeth Budden (c. 1780–1832) – Always Happy!!: Or, Anecdotes of Felix and his Sister Serena. A Tale
Kir Bulychev (1934–2003) – Alisa Selezneva series
Elizabeth C. Bunce (living) – A Curse Dark as Gold, StarCrossed, Myrtle Hardcastle Mystery series Premeditated Myrtle, Cold-Blooded Myrtle
Eve Bunting (born 1928) – Smoky Night
John Bunyan (1628–1688) – Pilgrim's Progress
Robert J. Burch (1925–2007) – Queenie Peavy, Ida Early Comes Over the Mountain
Della Burford (born 1946) – Journey to Dodoland, Magical Earth Secrets, Miracle Galaxy
Anthony Burgess (1917–1993) – A Long Trip to Tea Time, The Land Where the Ice Cream Grows
Gelett Burgess (1866–1951) – Goops series, and many poems for children including "Purple Cow"
Thornton Burgess (1874–1965) – The Adventures of Danny Meadow Mouse, Old Mother West Wind
Doris Burn (1923–2011) – Andrew Henry's Meadow, The Summerfolk
Alice Hale Burnett (fl. early 20th c.) – The Merryvale Boys
Frances Hodgson Burnett (1849–1924) – A Little Princess, Little Lord Fauntleroy, The Secret Garden
Sheila Burnford (1918–1984) – The Incredible Journey
Edgar Rice Burroughs (1875–1950) – Tarzan series
Hester Burton (1913–2000) – Time of Trial
Virginia Lee Burton (1909–1968) – The Little House, Mike Mulligan and His Steam Shovel
A. J. Butcher – Spy High series
Rumena Bužarovska (born 1981) – What the Ladybug Saw 
Betsy Byars (1928–2020) – Summer of the Swans, Tornado
Georgia Byng (born 1965) – Molly Moon's Incredible Book of Hypnotism, Molly Moon Stops the World

C

Meg Cabot (born 1967) – The Princess Diaries, Allie Finkle's Rules for Girls
Eleanor Cameron (1912–1996) – The Wonderful Flight to the Mushroom Planet, The Court of the Stone Children
Joanna Campbell (born 1946) – Thoroughbred series
Cao Wenxuan (born 1954) – Bronze and Sunflower
William Cardell (1780–1828) – The Story of Jack Halyard, the Sailor Boy
Rosa Nouchette Carey (1840–1909) – Not Like Other Girls, Heriot's Choice
Eric Carle (1929–2021) – The Very Hungry Caterpillar, The Very Busy Spider
Natalie Savage Carlson (1906–1997) – The Happy Orpheline, The Family Under the Bridge, The Empty Schoolhouse
Isobelle Carmody (born 1958) – The Legend of Little Fur, Magic Night, Obernewtyn Chronicles
Lewis Carroll (1832–1898) – Alice's Adventures in Wonderland, Through the Looking-Glass
Anne Laurel Carter (born 1953) – The Shepherd's Granddaughter, Under a Prairie Sky 
Peter Carter (1929–1999) – The Sentinels, Children of the Book, Borderlands
Neelam Saxena Chandra (born 1969) – Five Tales, Tales from Sundervan, Pankhudiyaan, Chanda
Scott Chantler (born 1972) – Two Generals, Three Thieves, NorthWest Passage
Charles III (born 1948) – The Old Man of Lochnagar
Geoffrey Chaucer (c. 1343–1400) – Chanticleer and the Fox (from The Canterbury Tales)
Nan Chauncy (1900–1970) – They Found a Cave, Tiger in the Bush, Devils' Hill, Tangara
Simon Cheshire (born 1954) – Saxby Smart: Private Detective, Pants on Fire, Operation Sting
Ruth Chew (1920–2010) – The Wednesday Witch, What the Witch Left, The Trouble with Magic 
Lauren Child (born 1965) – Charlie and Lola series, Clarice Bean series
Irma Chilton (1930–1990) – Take Away the Flowers
John Christopher (1922–2012) – The Prince in Waiting series, The Tripods trilogy
Matt Christopher (1917–1997) – Wild Pitch, The Kid Who Only Hit Homers, Tough to Tackle
Korney Chukovsky (1882–1969) – Moydodyr
Mrs. Henry Clarke (1853–1908) – Miss Merivale's Mistake, Put to the Proof
Pauline Clarke (1921–2013) – The Twelve and the Genii
Beverly Cleary (1916–2021) – Ramona Quimby series
Andrew Clements (1949–2019) – Frindle, A Week in the Woods
Eleanor Clymer (1906–2001) – The Trolley Car Family
Susan Clymer (born 1951) – Animals in Room 202 series
Joanna Cole (1944–2020) – The Magic School Bus series
Chris Colfer (born 1990) – The Land of Stories
Eoin Colfer (born 1965) – Artemis Fowl series
Sneed B. Collard III (born 1959) – Hangman's Gold, The Governor's Dog is Missing!, Dog 4491
Suzanne Collins (born 1962) – The Underland Chronicles, The Hunger Games trilogy
Carlo Collodi (1826–1890) – The Adventures of Pinocchio
Joséphine Colomb (1833–1892) – La fille de Carilès
Padraic Colum (1881–1972) – The King of Ireland's Son
John Amos Comenius (1592–1670) – Orbis Sesualim Pictis (The Visible World in Pictures)
Ying Chang Compestine (born 1963) – Secrets of the Terra-Cotta Soldier, The Chinese Emperor's New Clothes 
Harriet Theresa Comstock (1860–1925) – Molly the Drummer Boy, Janet of the Dunes
Jane Leslie Conly (born 1948) – Racso and the Rats of NIMH, R-T, Margaret, and the Rats of NIMH, Crazy Lady!
Susan Coolidge (1835–1905) – What Katy Did series
Barbara Cooney (1917–2000) – Chanticleer and the Fox, Miss Rumphius
Susan Cooper (born 1935) – The Dark Is Rising series, The Boggart
Esther Copley (1786–1851) – Early Friendships
Zizou Corder – Lionboy series
William Corlett (1938–2005) – The Magician's House series
Rachel Cosgrove (1922–1998) – The Hidden Valley of Oz
John Cotton (1585–1652) – Milk for Babes catechism
Bruce Coville (born 1950) – Space Brat, My Teacher is an Alien, Aliens Ate My Homework, The Unicorn Chronicles, Magic Shop series
Joy Cowley (born 1936) – The Silent One, Bow Down Shadrach
Palmer Cox (1840–1924) – The Brownies series
John Coy (born 1958) – Night Driving, Crackback
Joe Craig (born 1981) – Jimmy Coates series
Ion Creangă (1837–1889) –  Childhood Memories, The Goat and Her Three Kids, Harap Alb, Ivan Turbincă, Dănilă Prepeleac
Sharon Creech (born 1945) – Walk Two Moons, Ruby Holler, Heartbeat
Helen Cresswell (1934–2005) – The Bagthorpe Saga
Richmal Crompton (1890–1969) – Just William
Michael Cronin (born 1942) – Against the Day series
Gillian Cross (born 1945) – Wolf, The Great Elephant Chase, The Demon Headmaster series
Sarah Crossan – The Weight of Water, Apple and Rain, One
Kevin Crossley-Holland (born 1941) – Storm, The Seeing Stone
Catherine Crowe (1790–1872) – Pippie's Warning; or, Mind Your Temper
Gabriella Csire (born 1938) – Turpi series
John Cunliffe (1933–2018) – Postman Pat series; Rosie & Jim series
Jane Louise Curry (born 1932) – Abaloc series, Poor Tom's Ghost, The Egyptian Box, The Black Canary
Chara M. Curtis  - How Far to Heaven, All I See Is Part of Me, No One Walks on My Father's Moon, Fun Is a Feeling

D

Debbie Dadey (born 1959) – The Adventures of the Bailey School Kids
Roald Dahl (1916–1990) – Charlie and the Chocolate Factory, Matilda, The BFG, James and the Giant Peach, The Witches, Fantastic Mr Fox
Alice Dalgliesh (1893–1979) – The Bears on Hemlock Mountain, The Courage of Sarah Noble, The Silver Pencil
Annie Dalton (born 1948) – Angels Unlimited series, Afterdark series
David Scott Daniell (1906–1965) – Young English, Mission for Oliver, The Dragon and the Rose, By Jiminy
Lucy Daniels (born 1960) – Animal Ark, Dolphin Diaries
Paula Danziger (1944–2004) – The Cat Ate My Gymsuit, Amber Brown series
James Dashner (born 1972) – The 13th Reality series
Alan Davidson (born 1943) – Annabel series, Light, The Bewitching of Alison Allbright
Stephen Mark Davies (born 1976) – Sophie series, Hacking Timbuktu, Outlaw
Lavinia R. Davis (1909–1961) – The Wild Birthday Cake, Buttonwood Island, Donkey Detectives
Mary Hayes Davis (c.1884–1948) – Chinese Fables and Folk Stories (with Chow Leung)
Jean D'Costa (born 1937) – Escape to Last Man Peak
Edmondo De Amicis (1846–1908) – Heart (Cuore)
Marguerite de Angeli (1889–1987) – The Door in the Wall, Black Fox of Lorne, Bright April
Jeanne de Cavally (1926–1992) – Pouê-pouê, le petit cabri
Walter de la Mare (1873–1956) – The Three Mulla Mulgars, Songs of Childhood, Peacock Pie, Collected Stories for Children
Silvana De Mari (born 1953) – The Last Dragon
Terry Deary (born 1946) – The Fire Thief, Master Crook's Crime Academy series
Jan Deberitz (1950–2014)
Daniel Defoe (1660–1731) – Robinson Crusoe
Meindert DeJong (1906–1991) – The Wheel on the School, The House of Sixty Fathers
Lavinia Derwent (1909–1989) – Tammy Troot, Sula
Kate DiCamillo (born 1964) – Because of Winn Dixie, The Tale of Despereaux, The Miraculous Journey of Edward Tulane, Flora & Ulysses: The Illuminated Adventures
Charles Dickens (1812–1870) – A Christmas Carol, Oliver Twist, The Magic Fishbone
Peter Dickinson (1927–2015) – The Changes trilogy, Tulku, City of Gold, Eva, The Kin
Miep Diekmann (1925–2017) – The Haunted Island, Just a Street, Slave Doctor
Anne Digby (born 1935) – Trebizon series
Thomas M. Disch (1940–2008) – The Brave Little Toaster, The Brave Little Toaster Goes to Mars
Tony DiTerlizzi (born 1969) – The Spiderwick Chronicles, Beyond the Spiderwick Chronicles
Franklin W. Dixon (Stratemeyer house pseudonym from 1927) – The Hardy Boys series
Rex Dixon (1908–1971) – Pocomoto series
Chris D'Lacey (born 1954) – The Fire Within series
Lynley Dodd (born 1941) – Hairy Maclary, Slinky Malinki
Mary Mapes Dodge (1831–1905) – Hans Brinker or the Silver Skates
Julia Donaldson (born 1948) – The Gruffalo, Monkey Puzzle, The Troll
Amanda Minnie Douglas (1831–1916) – A Little Girl series, Helen Grant series, A Modern Cinderella
Siobhan Dowd (1960–2007) – The London Eye Mystery, Bog Child
Debra Doyle (1952–2020) – School of Wizardry, Knight's Wyrd
Roddy Doyle (born 1958) – Not Just for Christmas, Wilderness
Tonke Dragt (born 1930) – The Letter for the King, The Secrets of the Wild Wood
Crescent Dragonwagon (born 1952) – Always, Always, Home Place, Half a Moon and One Whole Star
Anna Harriett Drury (also Harriet, 1824–1912) – The Three Half-Crowns: a story for boys, Richard Rowe's Parcel
William Pène du Bois (1916–1993) – The Twenty-One Balloons
Diane Duane (born 1952) – So You Want to Be a Wizard
Ursula Dubosarsky (born 1961) – The Red Shoe, The Golden Day, The Blue Cat
Tessa Duder (born 1940) – Alex Archer series, Tiggie Tompson series
Florence Dugdale (1879–1937) – The Book of Baby Birds
Lois Duncan (1934–2016) – I Know What You Did Last Summer, A Gift of Magic
Jeanne DuPrau (born 1944) – The Books of Ember series
Christine Dzidrums (born 1971) – Cutters Don't Cry, Gabby Douglas: Golden Smile, Golden Triumph

E

Edward Eager (1911–1964) – Half Magic, Magic by the Lake, Knight's Castle, The Time Garden, The Well-Wishers, Magic or Not, Seven-Day Magic
Marion Eames (1921–2007) – Sionyn a Siarli, Huw a'r Adar Aur, Y Tir Tywyll (in Welsh)
Martin Ebbertz (born 1962) – Little Mr. Jaromir
Irmengarde Eberle (1898–1979)
Walter D. Edmonds (1903–1998) – The Matchlock Gun, Bert Breen's Barn
Dorothy Edwards (1914–1982) – My Naughty Little Sister, The Witches and the Grinnygog
Julie Edwards (Dame Julie Andrews) (born 1935) – The Last of the Really Great Whangdoodles
Leo Edwards (1884–1944) – Jerry Todd series, Poppy Ott series
Monica Edwards (1912–1998) – Punchbowl Farm series, Romney Marsh series
Stephen Elboz (born 1956) – The Byzantium Bazaar
T. S. Eliot (1888–1965) – Old Possum's Book of Practical Cats
E. C. Eliott (1908–1971) – Kemlo and Tas series
David Elliott (born 1947) – Bull, Evangeline Mudd and the Great Mink Escapade, Knitty Kitty 
Janice Elliott (1931–1995) – The Sword and the Dream
Sarah Ellis (born 1952) – Pick-Up Sticks
Jonathan Emmett (born 1965) – Bringing Down the Moon, Someone Bigger, The Princess and the Pig
Michael Ende (1929–1995) – The Neverending Story, Momo, Jim Button and Luke the Engine Driver
Margarita Engle (born 1951) – The Surrender Tree: Poems of Cuba's Struggle for Freedom
Elizabeth Enright (1909–1968) – The Melendy series, Thimble Summer, Gone-Away Lake
Hans Magnus Enzensberger (1929–2022) – The Number Devil, Where Were You, Robert?
Louise Erdrich (born 1954) – The Birchbark House, The Game of Silence
John R. Erickson (born 1943) – Hank the Cowdog
Eleanor Estes (1908–1988) – The Moffats, Rufus M., The Hundred Dresses, Ginger Pye
Juliana Horatia Ewing (1841–1885) – A Flat Iron for a Farthing, The Story of a Short Life

F

John Meade Falkner (1858–1932) – Moonfleet
Eleanor Farjeon (1881–1965) – Martin Pippin in the Apple Orchard, The Little Bookroom
Walter Farley (1915–1989) – The Black Stallion series
Nancy Farmer (born 1941) – The House of the Scorpion, The Ear, the Eye and the Arm, A Girl Named Disaster
Penelope Farmer (born 1939) – Charlotte Sometimes, The Summer Birds, A Castle of Bone
G. E. Farrow (1862 – c. 1920) – The Wallypug of Why, The Little Panjandrum's Dodo
Gertrude Minnie Faulding (1875–1961) – Old Man's Beard and Other Tales
Tim Federle – Better Nate Than Ever, The Great American Whatever
Eliza Fenwick (1766–1840) – Mary and Her Cat, Visits to the Junior Library
Ruby Ferguson (1899–1966) – Jill's Gymkhana, A Stable for Jill, Jill's Pony Trek
Chitra Fernando (1935–1998) – Glass Bangles, The Adventures of Senerat Bandara, Bempi Appu
Eugene Field (1850–1895) – Wynken, Blynken, and Nod
Sarah Fielding (1710–1768) – The Governess, or The Little Female Academy
Anne Fine (born 1947) – The Tulip Touch, Madame Doubtfire, Flour Babies
Nadia Fink (born 1977) – Anti-Princess series and Anti-Hero series
Martha Finley (1828–1909) – Elsie Dinsmore series, Mildred Keith series
Aileen Fisher (1906–2002) – We Alcotts, I Heard a Bluebird Sing
Catherine Fisher (born 1957) – The Snow-Walker, The Book of the Crow, The Oracle, Corbenic
Dorothy Canfield Fisher (1879–1958) – Understood Betsy
John D. Fitzgerald (1906–1988) – The Great Brain series
Louise Fitzhugh (1928–1974) – Harriet the Spy, Nobody's Family Is Going to Change
Philippe Fix (born 1937)
Marjorie Flack (1897–1958) – The Story of Ping, Angus and the Ducks
John Flanagan (born 1944) – Ranger's Apprentice series
Paul Fleischman (born 1952) – Bull Run, Joyful Noise: Poems for Two Voices
Sid Fleischman (1920–2010) – The Whipping Boy, By The Great Horn Spoon!
Ian Fleming (1908–1964) – Chitty Chitty Bang Bang
Shamini Flint (born 1969) – Ten: A Soccer Story, Diary of a Soccer Star, The Seeds of Time, Sasha Visits series
Esther Forbes (1891–1967) – Johnny Tremain
Antonia Forest (1915–2003) – Autumn Term, Falconer's Lure and other Marlow Family books
Elena Fortún (1886–1952) – Celia, lo que dice, Celia en el colegio
Helen Fox (born 1962) – Eager series
Anne Frank (1929–1945) – The Diary of a Young Girl
Barbara C. Freeman (1906–1999) – Two-Thumb Thomas, Timi, the Tale of a Griffin
Don Freeman (1908–1978) – Corduroy
Pamela Freeman (born 1960) – The Willow Tree's Daughter, The Black Dress, Cherryblossom and the Golden Bear
Jackie French (born 1953) – Hitler's Daughter, Diary of a Wombat, Pete the Sheep, School for Heroes
Frieda Friedman (born 1905, date of death unknown) – Dot for Short, Pat and Her Policeman, Carol from the Country
Cornelia Funke (born 1958) – The Thief Lord, Inkheart series
Sandy Fussell (born 1960) – Samurai Kids series, Polar Boy
Rose Fyleman (1877–1957) – Fairies and Chimneys, The Fairy Green, The Dolls' House
Fynn (pseudonym of Sydney Hopkins, 1919–1999) – Mister God, This Is Anna

G

Jostein Gaarder (born 1952) – Sophie's World, The Christmas Mystery
Eva Roe Gaggin (1879–1966) – Down Ryton Water, An Ear for Uncle Emil
Arkady Gaidar (1904–1941) – Timur and His Squad
Neil Gaiman (born 1960) – Coraline, The Graveyard Book
Paul Gallico (1897–1976) – The Snow Goose, Manxmouse, Jennie, The Day the Guinea-Pig Talked
Sally Gardner – The Countess's Calamity, I, Coriander, The Red Necklace
Leon Garfield (1921–1996) – Devil-in-the-Fog, Smith, The God Beneath the Sea, John Diamond
Howard R. Garis (1873–1962) – Uncle Wiggily Longears series
Alan Garner (born 1934) – The Owl Service, The Weirdstone of Brisingamen, The Moon of Gomrath, Elidor, Red Shift, The Stone Book Quartet
Eve Garnett (1900–1991) – The Family from One End Street
Doris Gates (1901–1987) – Blue Willow
Margaret Gatty (1809–1873) – Parables from Nature, Aunt Judy's Tales
Jamila Gavin (born 1941) – Coram Boy, Grandpa Chatterji
Béatrice Lalinon Gbado (born 1984) – Beautiful Debo, Bovi series, Kaïvi series
Anna Genover-Mas (born 1963) – The Grumpy Gardener
Jean Craighead George (1919–2012) – My Side of the Mountain, Julie of the Wolves
Jessica Day George (born 1976) – Princess of the Midnight Ball, Dragon Slippers
Adèle Geras (born 1944) – Apricots at Midnight, The Girls in the Velvet Frame, The Fabulous Fantoras
Charles "Father Goose" Ghigna (born 1946) – Mice Are Nice, Riddle Rhymes, A Fury of Motion: Poems for Boys
May Gibbs (1877–1969) – Snugglepot and Cuddlepie
Patricia Reilly Giff (1935–2021) – The Polk Street School series, Lily's Crossing, Pictures of Hollis Woods, Eleven, Storyteller
Fred Gipson (1908–1973) – Old Yeller
Debi Gliori (born 1959) – Pure Dead series, Mr Bear series, Witch Baby series, The Tobermory Cat, What's the Time, Mr Wolf?
Rumer Godden (1907–1998) – The Doll's House, The Mousewife, The Diddakoi
Glenda Goertzen (born 1967) – The Prairie Dogs, City Dogs
John Henry Goldfrap (1879–1917) – The Ocean Wireless Boys, The Boy Aviators, The Dreadnought Boys
Julia Golding (born 1969) – The Diamond of Drury Lane, Secret of the Sirens
Oliver Goldsmith (1730–1774) – The History of Little Goody Two-Shoes
Elizabeth Goudge (1900–1984) – The Little White Horse, Linnets and Valerians
Candy Gourlay (born 1962) – Tall Story, Shine, Bone Talk
Harry Graham (1874–1936) – Ruthless Rhymes for Heartless Homes
Kenneth Grahame (1859–1932) – The Wind in the Willows
Hardie Gramatky (1907–1979) – Little Toot
Mary Grannan (1900–1975) – Just Mary, Maggie Muggins
John Grant (1930–2014) – Little Nose stories
Nicholas Stuart Gray (1922–1981) – Grimbold's Other World, The Seventh Swan
Alain Grée (born 1936)
John Green (born 1977) – Looking for Alaska, An Abundance of Katherines, Paper Towns, The Fault in Our Stars, Will Grayson, Will Grayson, Let It Snow
Roger Lancelyn Green (1918–1987) – King Arthur and His Knights of the Round Table, The Luck of Troy
Kate Greenaway (1846–1901) – Under the Window
Frances Nimmo Greene (1867-1937) — Legends of King Arthur and His Court
Graham Greene (1904–1991) – The Little Train, The Little Fire Engine, The Little Horse Bus, The Little Steamroller
James Greenwood (1832–1929) – The True History of a Little Ragamuffin
Kristiana Gregory (born 1951) – Earthquake at Dawn, The Stowaway, Jenny of the Tetons
Andy Griffiths (born 1961) – The Bad Book, Just Tricking, The 13-Storey Treehouse, Treasure Fever!
Jacob and Wilhelm Grimm (1785–1863 and 1786–1859) – Grimm's Fairy Tales
Maria Gripe (1923–2007) – Hugo and Josephine, In the Time of the Bells, Elvis and His Secret
John Grisham (born 1955) – Theodore Boone: Kid Lawyer series
Annie Groovie (born 1970) – Léon series
Johnny Gruelle (1880–1938) – Raggedy Ann series
Jacqueline Guest — Free Throw, Triple Threat, Death by Dinosaur
Kristín Helga Gunnarsdóttir (born 1963) – Fiasol series
Dan Gutman (born 1955) – The Million Dollar Shot, Baseball Card Adventures, My Weird School series
Bethan Gwanas (born 1962) – Llinyn Trôns, Sgôr

H

Maria Hack (1777–1844) – Winter Evenings, Harry Beaufoy, or, The Pupil of Nature
Margaret Peterson Haddix (born 1964) – Shadow Children series
Mark Haddon (born 1962) – The Curious Incident of the Dog in the Night-Time, Agent Z series
Matt Haig (born 1975) – Shadow Forest, A Boy Called Christmas
Virginia Hamilton (1936–2002) – M. C. Higgins the Great
Leif Hamre (1914–2007) – Otter Three Two Calling, Contact Lost, Blue Two ... Bale Out
H. Irving Hancock (c. 1866–1922) – High School Boys series, West Point series, Young Engineers series
Joyce Hansen (born 1942) – The Gift-Giver, The Captive, I Thought My Soul Would Rise and Fly
Frances Hardinge (born 1973) – Fly by Night, The Lie Tree
Roger Hargreaves (1935–1988) – Mr. Men series, Little Miss series
Cynthia Harnett (1893–1981) – The Wool-Pack, The Load of Unicorn, The Writing on the Hearth
Amanda Bartlett Harris (1824–1917) – How We Went Birds' Nesting, Little Folks' Every Day Book
Joel Chandler Harris (1845–1908) – Uncle Remus
Rosemary Harris (1923–2019) – The Moon in the Cloud, A Quest for Orion, Zed
Edith Ogden Harrison (1862–1955) – Prince Silverwings, The Star Fairies
Lisi Harrison (born 1970) – The Clique series, Alpha series, Monster High books
Peter Härtling (1933–2017) – Oma, 
Sonya Hartnett (born 1968) – The Silver Donkey, The Children of the King
Juanita Havill (born 1949) – Jamaica series, Eyes Like Willy's
Charles Hawes (1889–1923) – The Dark Frigate, The Great Quest
Barbara Haworth-Attard (born 1953) –  TruthSinger, To Stand on My Own, A Trail of Broken Dreams
Nathaniel Hawthorne (1804–1864) –  A Wonder-Book for Girls and Boys, Tanglewood Tales
Carolyn Haywood (1898–1990) – Betsy series, Eddie series 
Helen Haywood (1907–1995) – Peter Tiggywig series
Carol Hedges – Jigsaw, Spy Girl series
Florence Parry Heide (1919–2011) – The Shrinking of Treehorn
Robert A. Heinlein (1907–1988)  – Rocket Ship Galileo, Have Space Suit—Will Travel
Racey Helps (1913–1970) – Barnaby Littlemouse series
Zenna Henderson (1917–1983) – Ingathering: The Complete People Stories
Marguerite Henry (1902–1997) – King of the Wind, Misty of Chincoteague
G. A. Henty (1832–1902) – Out on the Pampas, The Young Buglers, The Cat of Bubastes, With Lee in Virginia, Beric the Briton
James Herriot (1916–1995) – All Creatures Great and Small, James Herriot's Treasury for Children
Karen Hesse (born 1952) – Out of the Dust, The Music of Dolphins
Carl Hiaasen (born 1953) – Hoot
Clifford B. Hicks (1920–2010) – First Boy on the Moon, The Marvelous Inventions of Alvin Fernald
E. W. Hildick (1925–2001) – Jack McGurk mysteries, Jim Starling series
Lorna Hill (1902–1991) – A Dream of Sadler's Wells
Nigel Hinton (born 1941) – Buddy, Beaver Towers
S. E. Hinton (born 1948) – The Outsiders, That Was Then, This Is Now, Rumble Fish
Russell Hoban (1925–2011) – The Mouse and His Child
Will Hobbs (born 1947) – Bearstone,  Beardream, Ghost Canoe, Go Big or Go Home
Michael Hoeye (born 1947) – Hermux Tantamoq series
E. T. A. Hoffmann (1776–1822) – The Nutcracker and the Mouse King
Mary Hoffman (born 1945) – Stravaganza series, Amazing Grace
Barbara Hofland (1770–1844) – The Son of a Genius, The Blind Farmer and His Children, The Young Crusoe
Christophe Honoré (born 1970) – Tout contre Léo
Laura Lee Hope (Stratemeyer house pseudonym from 1904) – Bobbsey Twins series
Anthony Horowitz (born 1955) – Alex Rider series, The Diamond Brothers series, The Gatekeepers series
Hasan Hourani (1974–2003) – Hassan Everywhere
Janni Howker – The Nature of the Beast, Badger on the Barge
Carol Hughes (born 1955) – Jack Black and the Ship of Thieves, Dirty Magic, The Princess and the Unicorn
Ted Hughes (1938–1998) – The Iron Man
Thomas Hughes (1822–1896) – Tom Brown's School Days
Shirley Hughes (1927–2022) – Dogger, Hero on a Bicycle, Ella's Big Chance, Alfie series
John Hulme (born 1970) – The Seems series
Irene Hunt (1907–2001) – Up a Road Slowly, The Lottery Rose
Erin Hunter (joint pseudonym from 2003) – Warriors series, Seekers series
Norman Hunter (1899–1995) – Professor Branestawm series
Emily Huws (born 1942) – Cyfres Corryn: Chwannen, Lol neu Lwc?
Zach Hyman (born 1992) – The Magician's Secret, Hockey Hero, The Bambino and Me

I
Eva Ibbotson (1925–2010) – Which Witch?, The Secret of Platform 13, Journey to the River Sea
Theodor Illek (born 1984) – The Golden Key
Jean Ingelow (1820–1897) – Mopsa the Fairy
Mick Inkpen (born 1962) – Kipper the Dog series, Wibbly Pig series
Mary E. Ireland (1834–1927) – Timothy and His Friends
Washington Irving (1783–1859) – The Legend of Sleepy Hollow, Rip Van Winkle
Koji Ishikawa (born 1963) – Colorful Animals Hide and Seek series
Petre Ispirescu  (1830–1887) – Romanian Legends or Fairy Tales, Greuceanu
Oksana Ivanenko (1906–1997), Forest Tales

J

Joseph Jacobs (1854–1916) – English Fairy Tales, Celtic Fairy Tales, European Folk and Fairy Tales
Brian Jacques (1939–2011) – Redwall series, Castaways of the Flying Dutchman
Grace James – John and Mary series, Green Willow and Other Japanese Fairy Tales
James Janeway (1636–1674) – A Token for Children
Éva Janikovszky (1926–2003) – If I Were a Grown-Up, Who Does This Kid Take After?
Tove Jansson (1914–2001) – Moomin series
Annie Jay (born 1957) – Complot à Versailles, À la poursuite d'Olympe
Richard Jefferies (1848–1887) – Wood Magic, Bevis
Theodora Robinson Jenness (1847–1935) – Two Young Homesteaders, Piokee, Above the Range
Paul Jennings (born 1943) – Unreal!, Undone!, Unbelievable!, The Paw Thing, The Gizmo, Wicked series
W. E. Johns (1893–1968) – Biggles series
Annie Fellows Johnston (1863–1931) – The Little Colonel, Miss Santa Claus of the Pullman
Diana Wynne Jones (1934–2011) – Chrestomanci series, Howl's Moving Castle, Dogsbody
Lara Jones (1975–2010) – Poppy Cat series
Marcia Thornton Jones (born 1958) – The Adventures of the Bailey School Kids series, Ghostville Elementary series
T. Llew Jones (1915–2009) – Trysor Plas y wernen, Anturiaethau Twm Siôn Cati: Y Ffordd Beryglus
Terry Jones (1942–2020) – Fairy Tales, The Saga of Erik the Viking, Squire series
Jacqueline Jules (born 1956) – Zapato Power series, Unite or Die: How Thirteen States Became a Nation
Norton Juster (1929–2021) – The Phantom Tollbooth, The Hello, Goodbye Window
May Justus (1898–1989) – Gabby Gaffer, Luck for Little Lihu, New Boy in School

K

Keri Kaa (1942–2020) – Taka Ki Ro Wai
Cynthia Kadohata (born 1956) – Kira-Kira, Weedflower, The Thing About Luck
Eiko Kadono (born 1935) – Kiki's Delivery Service
Joan Kahn (1914–1994) – Ladies and Gentlemen, said the Ringmaster, Seesaw, You Can't Catch Me
Maira Kalman (born 1949) – Fireboat, Max Stravinsky: Poet-Dog series
Ulrich Karger (born 1957) – The Scary Sleepover
Jan Karon (born 1937) – Miss Fannie's Hat
Erich Kästner (1899–1974) – Emil and the Detectives, Lottie and Lisa, The Flying Classroom
Elizabeth Kay (born 1949) – The Divide trilogy
Annie Keary (1825–1879) – Heroes of Asgard
Ezra Jack Keats (1916–1983) – The Snowy Day, Whistle for Willie, Goggles!
Carolyn Keene (Stratemeyer house pseudonym from 1930) – Nancy Drew mystery series
Charles Keeping (1924–1988) – Charley, Charlotte and the Golden Canary
Harold Keith (1903–1998) – Rifles for Watie
Eric P. Kelly (1884–1960) – The Trumpeter of Krakow
Gene Kemp (1926–2015) – The Turbulent Term of Tyke Tiler, The Pride of Tamworth Pig
Louise Andrews Kent (1886–1969) – He Went with Marco Polo, He Went with Hannibal, Two Children of Tyre
Judith Kerr (1923–2019) – When Hitler Stole Pink Rabbit, The Tiger Who Came To Tea
Lady Amabel Kerr (1846–1906), A Bible Picture Book for Catholic Children, Lives of the Saints for Children 
P. B. Kerr (1956–2018) – Children of the Lamp series
Alexander Key (1904–1979) – Escape to Witch Mountain, The Forgotten Door, The Case of the Vanishing Boy
Dorothy Kilner (1755–1836) – The Life and Perambulation of a Mouse
Garry Kilworth (born 1941) – The Welkin Weasels series, Knights of Liöfwende series, Attica
Clive King (1924–2018) – Stig of the Dump
Dick King-Smith (1922–2011) – The Sheep-Pig, The Queen's Nose
Charles Kingsley (1819–1875) – The Water Babies, The Heroes
Jeff Kinney (born 1971) – Diary of a Wimpy Kid series
Rudyard Kipling (1865–1936) – Just So Stories, The Jungle Book, Puck of Pook's Hill
Ole Lund Kirkegaard (1940–1979) 
Jim Kjelgaard (1910–1959) – Kalak of the Ice, Fire-Hunter, The Spell of the White Sturgeon, Wolf Brother
Jon Klassen (born 1981) – This Is Not My Hat
Annette Curtis Klause (born 1953) – Blood and Chocolate
Anne Knight (1792–1860) – School-Room Lyrics, Mary Gray
Nellie van Kol (1851-1930) – Ons Blaadje
E. L. Konigsburg (1930–2013) – From the Mixed Up Files of Mrs. Basil E. Frankweiler, The Second Mrs. Giaconda, The View from Saturday
Robin Koontz (born 1954) – In a Cabin in a Wood, Leaps and Creeps: How Animals Move to Survive
Janusz Korczak (1878–1942) – King Matt the First, Kaytek the Wizard
Conor Kostick (born 1964) – Epic, Saga, Edda, Move, The Book of Curses, The Book of Wishes
Erik P. Kraft – Chocolatina, Lenny and Mel series, Miracle Wimp
Ruth Krauss (1901–1993) – The Carrot Seed
Adrienne Kress – Alex and the Ironic Gentleman, Timothy and the Dragon's Gate 
Uma Krishnaswami (born 1956) – Naming Maya, Monsoon
Joseph Krumgold (1908–1980) – ...And Now Miguel, Onion John
Guus Kuijer (born 1942) – Madelief series, Polleke series
Kunjunni (1927–2006) – Kunjunni Kavithakal
Jane Kurtz (born 1952) – River Friendly River Wild, Water Hole Waiting

L

María Hortensia Lacau (1910–2006) – País de Silvia, Chingola y Hornerín, Yo y Hornerín, El libro de Juancito Maricaminero
Selma Lagerlöf (1858–1940) – The Wonderful Adventures of Nils
Elizabeth Laird (born 1943) – The Garbage King, Crusade
Charles Lamb (1775–1834) and Mary Lamb (1764–1847) – Tales from Shakespeare
Derek Landy (born 1974) – Skulduggery Pleasant series
Andrew Lang (1844–1912) – The Blue Fairy Book, The Red Fairy Book, The Red Romance Book
Noel Langley (1911–1980) – The Land of Green Ginger
Katherine Langrish – Troll Fell, Troll Mill, Troll Blood
Jane Langton (1922–2018) – The Hall Family Chronicles series
Jennifer Lanthier (born 1964) – The Mystery of the Martello Tower, The Stamp Collector
Kirby Larson – The Magic Kerchief, Hattie Big Sky
Kathryn Lasky (born 1944) – Guardians of Ga'hoole series, The Night Journey
Dorothy P. Lathrop (1891–1980) – The Fairy Circus, The Dog in the Tapestry Garden
Caroline Lawrence (born 1954) – The Roman Mysteries
Michael Lawrence (born 1943) – The Snottle and other Jiggy McCue books, Young Dracula, The Aldous Lexicon
Robert Lawson (1892–1957) – Rabbit Hill, Ben and Me, They Were Strong and Good
Ervin Lázár (1936–2006) – The Seven Headed Fairy, The Little Boy and the Lions, The Square Round Wood
Ursula K. Le Guin (1929–2018) – Earthsea series, Very Far Away from Anywhere Else, Catwings series, Annals of the Western Shore series
Munro Leaf (1905–1976) – The Story of Ferdinand
Sarah Lean – A Dog Called Homeless 
Edward Lear (1812–1888) – "The Owl and the Pussycat", A Book of Nonsense
Diana Lebacs (1947–2022) – Nanco van Bonaire, Caimins geheim
Dennis Lee (born 1939) – Alligator Pie
Harper Lee (1926–2016) – To Kill a Mockingbird 
Robert Leeson (1928–2013) – The Third Class Genie, It's My Life
Madeleine L'Engle (1918–2007) – A Wrinkle in Time, Meet the Austins
Lois Lenski (1893–1974) – Phebe Fairchild: Her Book, Indian Captive: The Story of Mary Jemison, Strawberry Girl
Lois Gladys Leppard (1924–2008) – Mandie series
Peter Lerangis (born 1955) – Seven Wonders series, The Sword Thief and The Viper's Nest in The 39 Clues collaborative series, Spy X series, Abracadabra series
Helen Lester (born 1936) – Tacky the Penguin
Gail Carson Levine (born 1947) – Ella Enchanted, The Two Princesses of Bamarre, Fairest, Dave at Night, The Wish
Ted Lewin (1935–2021) – Peppe the Lamplighter
C. S. Lewis (1898–1963) – The Chronicles of Narnia series
Hilda Lewis (1896–1974) – The Ship That Flew, The Gentle Falcon
J. Patrick Lewis (born 1942) – A Hippopotamusn't, Swan Song, The House
J. S. Lewis (born 1972) – Grey Griffins
Naomi Lewis (1911–2009) – English translations of the works of Hans Christian Andersen
Grace Lin (born 1974) – Where the Mountain Meets the Moon, The Year of the Dog
Anne Lindbergh (1940–1993) – The People of Pineapple Place, The Worry Week, Nick of Time
Astrid Lindgren (1907–2002) – Pippi Longstocking, Ronia the Robber's Daughter
Eva Lindström (born 1952) – The Cat Hat, Olli och Mo, My Dog Mouse
Eric Linklater (1899–1974) – The Wind on the Moon, The Pirates in the Deep Green Sea
Leo Lionni (1910–1999) – Inch by Inch, Swimmy, Frederick, Alexander and the Wind-Up Mouse
Jean Little (1932–2020) – Mine for Keeps, From Anna, Orphan at My Door 
Penelope Lively (born 1933) – The Ghost of Thomas Kempe, A Stitch in Time
Monteiro Lobato (1882–1948) – Sítio do Picapau Amarelo series
Mira Lobe (1913–1995) – The Snowman Who Went for a Walk, Little I Am Me
Hugh Lofting (1886–1947) – Doctor Dolittle series
Jack London (1876–1916) – The Call of the Wild, White Fang
Lois Lowry (born 1937) – Number the Stars, The Giver, Anastasia Krupnik series
Nina Lugovskaya (1918–1993) – The Diary of a Soviet Schoolgirl, 1932–1937
Janet Lunn (1928–2017) – The Root Cellar, The Hollow Tree
Patricia Lynch (c. 1894–1972) – The Turf-Cutter's Donkey, Brogeen series
Elinor Lyon (1921–2008) – The House in Hiding, Carver's Journey, Run Away Home

M

Amy MacDonald (born 1951) – Little Beaver and the Echo, Rachel Fister's Blister
Betty MacDonald (1908–1958) – Mrs. Piggle-Wiggle series
George MacDonald (1824–1905) – At the Back of the North Wind,  The Princess and the Goblin
Ellen MacGregor (1906–1954) – Miss Pickerell series
Reginald James MacGregor – The Young Detectives
D. J. MacHale (born 1955) – The Pendragon Adventure
Angus MacVicar (1908–2001) – The Lost Planet

Sandra Magsamen (born 1959) – The Gift
Margaret Mahy (1936–2012) – The Haunting, The Changeover, Maddigan's Fantasia, Memory
Hector Malot (1830–1907) – Nobody's Boy (Sans Famille)
Clare Mallory (1913–1991) – Merry Begins, Juliet Overseas, The League of the Smallest
Ruth Manning-Sanders (1888–1988) – A Book of Dragons and other anthologies of fairy tales from around the world (A Book of ... series)
Daniel P. Mannix (1911–1997) – The Fox and the Hound
Alicia Catherine Mant (1788–1869) – Christmas, a Happy Time, Ellen, or The Young Godmother
Margaret Manuel — I See Me
Emilia Marryat (c. 1835–1875) – Amongst the Maoris 
Frederick Marryat (1792–1848) – The Children of the New Forest
John Marsden (born 1950) – Tomorrow series
Katherine Marsh (born 1974) – The Night Tourist, Jepp, Who Defied the Stars
James Edward Marshall (1942–1992), as James Marshall and/or Edward Marshall – Fox in Love, Fox and His Friends, Fox on Wheels
Ann M. Martin (born 1955) – The Babysitters Club series
Emily Winfield Martin – Dream Animals, Oddfellow's Orphanage
J. P. Martin (1880–1966) – Uncle series
Cissy van Marxveldt (1889–1948) – Joop ter Heul series
John Masefield (1878–1967) – The Midnight Folk, The Box of Delights
Cotton Mather (1663–1728) – A Token for the Children of New England
André Maurois (1885–1967) – Fattypuffs and Thinifers
Mercer Mayer (born 1943) – Little Critter series, Little Monster series
James Mayhew (born 1964) – Miranda the Explorer, Ella Bella Ballerina, The Knight Who Took All Day
William Mayne (1928–2010) – A Swarm in May (Choir School series), A Grass Rope, Earthfasts, Low Tide

Geraldine McCaughrean (born 1951) – Peter Pan in Scarlet, A Pack of Lies
Robert McCloskey (1914–2003) – Make Way for Ducklings, Time of Wonder, Blueberries for Sal
Eloise McGraw (1915–2000) – The Golden Goblet, The Moorchild, The Rundelstone of Oz
Lauren Lynn McGraw (1915–2000) – Merry Go Round in Oz
Lurline Wailana McGregor — Between the Deep Blue Sea and Me
Sharon E. McKay (born 1954) – Charlie Wilcox, Our Canadian Girl: Penelope series
David McKee (born 1935) – Toucan Two Can
Robin McKinley (born 1952) – The Hero and the Crown, The Blue Sword, Spindle's End
Patricia McKissack (1944–2017) – Christmas in the Big House, Christmas in the Quarters, Never Forgotten
Colin McNaughton (born 1951) – Captain Abdul's Pirate School
Janet McNeill (1907–1994) – My Friend Specs McCann, The Battle of St. George Without
Karen McQuestion – Celia and the Fairies, Edgewood
Geoffrey McSkimming (born 1962) – Cairo Jim series
L. T. Meade (1854–1914) – A World of Girls
Stephen W. Meader (1892–1977) – Boy with a Pack
Joe Medicine Crow (1913–2016) — Counting Coup: Becoming a Crow Chief on the Reservation and Beyond
Milton Meltzer (1915–2009) – The Black Americans, The American Revolutionaries, Mark Twain Himself
Jean Merrill (1923–2012) – The Pushcart War
Laurence Meynell (1899–1989) – The Old Gang
Karin Michaëlis (1872–1950) – Bibi 
Richard Michelson (born 1953) – Animals That Ought to Be: Poems about Imaginary Pets, Across the Alley
Katherine Milhous (1894–1977) – The Egg Tree
Olive Beaupre Miller (1883–1968) – My Book House series
A. A. Milne (1882–1956) – Winnie-the-Pooh, The House at Pooh Corner, When We Were Very Young
Elyne Mitchell (1913–2002) – Silver Brumby series
Ingvar Moe (1936–1993) – Dei må ikkje skyta Garm (They Musn't Shoot Garm)
Walter Moers (born 1957) – The 13½ Lives of Captain Bluebear
John Mole (born 1941) – "Variations on an old Rhyme"
Chris Monroe (born 1962) – Monkey with a Tool Belt, Sneaky Sheep
Lucy Maud Montgomery (1874–1942) – Anne of Green Gables series, Emily of New Moon
Susanna Moodie (1803–1885) – The Little Quaker, The Sailor Brother
Clement Clarke Moore (1779–1863) – "A Visit From St. Nicholas"
Pat Mora (born 1942) – Pablo's Tree, A Library for Juana, Confetti, Doña Flor, A Birthday Basket for Tia
Yuyi Morales (born 1968) – Niño Wrestles the World, Viva Frida, Little Night
Lorin Morgan-Richards (born 1975) – A Boy Born from Mold and Other Delectable Morsels, The Goodbye Family
John A. Moroso (1874–1957) – Nobody's Buddy
Michael Morpurgo (born 1943) – Why the Whales Came, The Wreck of the Zanzibar, Private Peaceful
Farley Mowat (1921–2014) – Lost in the Barrens, Owls in the Family
Robert Muchamore (born 1972) – CHERUB series, Henderson's Boys series
Dhan Gopal Mukerji (1890–1936 – Kari the Elephant, Gay Neck, the Story of a Pigeon, Hindu Fables for Little Children
Clara Mulholland (1849–1934) – The Strange Adventures of Little Snowdrop and Other Tales
Brandon Mull (born 1974) – Fablehaven series
Robert Munsch (born 1945) – Love You Forever, The Paper Bag Princess
Jill Murphy (1949–2021) – The Worst Witch, The Last Noo-Noo
Andrew Murray (born 1970) – Ghost Rescue
Susan Musgrave (born 1951) – Gullband, Dreams Are More Real Than Bathtubs

N

Beverley Naidoo (born 1943) – Journey to Jo'burg, The Other Side of Truth
Mali Madhavan Nair (1914–1994) – Mali Ramayanam, Mali Bhagavatham, Tenali Raman
Leela Nambudiripad (1934–2021) – Neypayasam, Mithayippoti
Claire Julie de Nanteuil (1834–1897) – Capitaine, L'Épave mystérieuse
P. Narendranath (1934–1991) – Vikritiraman
John Neal (1793–1876) – Great Mysteries and Little Plagues
Violet Needham (1876–1967) – The Black Riders, The Stormy Petrel, The Woods of Windri
John R. Neill (1877–1943) – The Wonder City of Oz, The Scalawagons of Oz, Lucky Bucky in Oz
Marilyn Nelson (born 1946) – A Wreath for Emmett Till, Snook Alone, Ostrich and Lark
Božena Němcová (1820–1862) – Slovak Fairy Tales and Legends, The Grandmother
Edith Nesbit (1858–1924) – The Story of the Treasure Seekers (Bastable series), The Railway Children, Five Children and It, The Phoenix and the Carpet, The Story of the Amulet
Patrick Ness (born 1971) – Chaos Walking trilogy, A Monster Calls, More Than This
John Newbery (1713–1767) – A Little Pretty Pocket-Book, intended for the Amusement of Little Master Tommy and Pretty Miss Polly with Two Letters from Jack the Giant Killer
Sally Nicholls (born 1983) – Ways to Live Forever, Season of Secrets, Things a Bright Girl Can Do
Jenny Nimmo (born c. 1944) – The Snow Spider trilogy, Children of the Red King/Charlie Bone series
Garth Nix (born 1963) – The Old Kingdom/Abhorsen series, The Keys to the Kingdom series, The Seventh Tower series
Joan Lowery Nixon (1927–2003) – Colonial Williamsburg series, Orphan Train series
Ethel Nokes (1883–1976) – The Fourth Form Gang, Nibs: The Story of a Pony
Andrew Norriss (born 1947) – Aquila, The Unluckiest Boy in the World
Grace May North (1876–1960) – Bobs, a Girl Detective, Meg of Mystery Mountain, Sisters, the Adele Doring series
Jessica Nelson North (1891–1988) – The Giant Shoe
Sterling North (1906–1974) – Rascal, The Wolfing
Carol Norton – pen name under which certain works of Grace May North (1876–1960) were reprinted
Mary Norton (1903–1992) – The Borrowers series, Bedknob and Broomstick
Nikolay Nosov (1908–1976) – The Adventures of Dunno and his Friends
Christine Nöstlinger (1936–2018) – Fly Away Home
Alfred Noyes (1880–1958) – The Secret of Pooduck Island, Daddy Fell into the Pond and Other Poems for Children
Sevinj Nurugizi (born 1964) – Kite

O

Graham Oakley (born 1929) – The Church Mice series, Magical Changes
Robert C. O'Brien (1918–1973) – Mrs. Frisby and the Rats of NIMH, Z for Zachariah
Jane O'Connor  (born 1947) – Fancy Nancy series
Scott O'Dell (1898–1989) – Island of the Blue Dolphins, The King's Fifth, The Black Pearl
Charles Ogden (Star Farm Productions pseudonym from 2003) – Edgar & Ellen series
Ian Ogilvy (born 1943) – Measle and the Wrathmonk, Measle and the Dragodon
Nnedi Okorafor (born 1974) – Zahrah the Windseeker, Akata Witch series 
Jenny Oldfield (born 1949) – My Magical Pony, Home Farm Twins, Horses of Half-Moon Ranch series
Sibylle von Olfers (1881–1916) – The Root Children, Little Princess in the Wood
Carola Oman (1897–1978) – Ferry the Fearless
Kenneth Oppel (born 1967) – Silverwing series, Airborn
Uri Orlev (born 1931) – The Island on Bird Street
Edward Ormondroyd (born 1925) – David and the Phoenix, Castaways on Long Ago, Time at the Top
Mary Pope Osborne (born 1949) – Magic Tree House series 
Pat O'Shea (1931–2007) – The Hounds of the Morrigan
Elsie J. Oxenham (1880–1960) – Abbey series

P

Roopa Pai – Taranauts, The Gita for Children
Sippy Pallippuram (born 1943) – Oridathoru Kunjunni
Bernard Palmer (1914–1998) – Danny Orlis series, Felicia Cartwright series
Christopher Paolini (born 1983) – Inheritance Cycle
Peggy Parish (1927–1988) and Herman Parish – Amelia Bedelia series
Barbara Park (1947–2013) – Skinnybones, Junie B. Jones series
Linda Sue Park (born 1960) – A Single Shard
Jenny Marsh Parker (1836–1913) – The Boy Missionary, What a Little Child Should Know
Peter Parnall (born 1936) – Winter Barn, Apple Tree, Woodpile
Anne Parrish (1888–1957) – The Dream Coach, Floating Island, The Story of Appleby Capple
Katherine Paterson (born 1932) – The Master Puppeteer, Bridge to Terabithia, The Great Gilly Hopkins, Jacob Have I Loved
Jill Paton Walsh (1937–2020) – Gaffer Samson's Luck, The Emperor's Winding Sheet
James Patterson (born 1947) – Maximum Ride series, The Dangerous Days of Daniel X
Gary Paulsen (1939–2021) – Hatchet, The Time Hackers
Michelle Paver (born 1960) – Chronicles of Ancient Darkness series
Philippa Pearce (1920–2006) – Tom's Midnight Garden
Kit Pearson (born 1947) – The Sky Is Falling, Awake and Dreaming
Ridley Pearson (born 1953) – Peter and the Starcatchers series, The Kingdom Keepers series
Howard Pease (1894–1974) – Secret Cargo, Highroad to Adventure, Bound for Singapore
Dale Peck (born 1967) – Drift House series
Ethel Pedley (1859–1898) – Dot and the Kangaroo
Mary Louise Peebles, a.k.a. Lynde Palmer (1833–1915) – The Magnet Stories
Bill Peet (1915–2002) – The Wump World, Hubert's Hair-Raising Adventure
Daniel Pennac (born 1944) – The Eye of the Wolf
Ethel Penrose (1857–1938) – Clear as the Noon Day
Lucy Fitch Perkins (1865–1937) – Twins series
Lynne Rae Perkins (born 1956) – Criss Cross, All Alone in the Universe
Sarah Maria Clinton Perkins (1824-1905) - Alice and Her Friends, Eugene Cooper
Charles Perrault (1628–1703) – Tales of Mother Goose, Little Red Riding Hood
K. M. Peyton (born 1929) – Flambards, Fly-by-Night, Prove Yourself a Hero, Blind Beauty
LeUyen Pham (born 1973) – Big Sister, Little Sister 
Rodman Philbrick (born 1951) – Freak The Mighty, Max the Mighty, The Last Book in the Universe, The Fire Pony
Joan Phipson (1912–2003) – The Boundary Riders, The Family Conspiracy, Polly's Tiger
Tamora Pierce (born 1954) – Tortall series, Circle of Magic series
Clara D. Pierson (1868–1952) – "Among the People" series
Christopher Pike (born 1954) – Spooksville series
Dav Pilkey (born 1966) – Captain Underpants series
Elizabeth Pinchard (fl. 1791–1820) – The Blind Child, or, Anecdotes of the Wyndham Family, The Two Cousins
Daniel Pinkwater (born 1941) – The Big Orange Splot, The Hoboken Chicken Emergency
Saviour Pirotta (born 1958) – The Orchard Book of First Greek Myths
Annabel Pitcher (born 1982) – My Sister Lives on the Mantelpiece, Ketchup Clouds
Sarah Pitt (fl. 1881–1900)
Kin Platt (1911–2003) – Big Max series, The Blue Man
Peter Pohl (born 1940) – Johnny, My Friend
Josephine Pollard (1834–1892) – The Brave Little Tailor, The Life of Washington, A Child's History of America: Told in One-Syllable Words, Bible Stories for Children
Delia Lyman Porter (1858–1933) – "Time and Tommy", "How Polly Saw the Aprons Grow"
Eleanor H. Porter (1868–1920) – Pollyanna
Tracey Porter – Billy Creekmore
Beatrix Potter (1866–1943) – The Tale of Peter Rabbit, The Tailor of Gloucester
Ellen Potter (born ) – Olivia Kidney series
Rhoda Power (1890–1957) – Redcap Runs Away
Núria Pradas (born 1954) – Sota el mateix cel
Terry Pratchett (1948–2015) – The Nome Trilogy, Johnny Maxwell series, The Amazing Maurice and his Educated Rodents, Tiffany Aching series
Otfried Preussler (1923–2013) – The Robber Hotzenplotz, The Curse of the Darkling Mill
Willard Price (1887–1983) – Amazon Adventure, Adventure series
Elise Primavera (born 1955) – The Secret Order of the Gumm Street Girls
Alison Prince (1931–2019) – My Royal Story
Alf Prøysen (1914–1970) – Mrs. Pepperpot series
Christine Pullein-Thompson (1925–2005) – We Rode to the Sea
Diana Pullein-Thompson (1925–2015) – I Wanted a Pony
Josephine Pullein-Thompson (1924–2014) – Six Ponies
Philip Pullman (born 1946) – His Dark Materials trilogy, Clockwork, The Firework-Maker's Daughter
Howard Pyle (1853–1911) – Otto of the Silver Hand, The Merry Adventures of Robin Hood, Men of Iron

R

Gwynedd Rae (1892–1977) – Mary Plain series
Janette Rallison (born 1966) – Fame, Glory, and Other Things on My To Do List
María Cristina Ramos (born 1952) – La luna lleva un silencio, El trasluz 
Arthur Ransome (1884–1967) – Swallows and Amazons series
Ellen Raskin (1928–1984) – The Westing Game, Figgs & Phantoms
Onjali Q. Raúf (born 1981) – The Boy at the Back of the Class, The Great (Food) Bank Heist
Marjorie Rawlings (1896–1953) – The Yearling, The Secret River
Wilson Rawls (1913–1984) – Where the Red Fern Grows, Summer of the Monkeys
Sukumar Ray (1887–1923) – HaJaBaRaLa, Abol Tabol, Pagla Dashu
Talbot Baines Reed (1852–1893) – The Fifth Form at St. Dominic's
W. Maxwell Reed (1871–1962) – The Earth for Sam, The Stars for Sam
Celia Rees (born 1949) – The Bailey Game, Witch Child, Pirates!
David Rees (1936–1993) – The Exeter Blitz, The Flying Island
Gwyneth Rees (born 1968) – The Mum Hunt, Fairy Dust series, Mermaid Magic
Philip Reeve (born 1966) – Buster Bayliss, Mortal Engines, Larklight 
Meta Mayne Reid (1905–1991) – Beyond the Wide World's End
Thomas Mayne Reid (1818–1883) – The Boy Hunters, The Young Voyageurs, The Boy Tar
Kathryn Reiss (born 1957) – Time Windows, Paint by Magic, Sweet Miss Honeywell's Revenge
Ren Rongrong (born 1923) – Nobrain and Neverhappy
Adam Rex (born 1973) – The True Meaning of Smekday, Cold Cereal, Fat Vampire, Frankenstein Makes a Sandwich
H. A. Rey (1898–1977) and Margret Rey (1906–1996) – Curious George series, Pretzel
Lou Rhodes – The Phlunk, The Phlunk's Worldwide Symphony
Frank Richards (1876–1961) – Greyfriars School stories featuring Billy Bunter
Justin Richards (born 1961) – The Invisible Detective series
Laura E. Richards (1850–1943) – Captain January, Tirra Lirra, Eletelephony
E. J. Richmond (1825–1918) – The Jewelled Serpent
Chris Riddell (born 1962) – The Edge Chronicles, Barnaby Grimes
E. V. Rieu (1887–1972) – The Flattered Flying Fish and Other Poems
Rick Riordan (born 1964) – Percy Jackson & the Olympians, The Heroes of Olympus, The Kane Chronicles, The Maze of Bones
Jamie Rix (born 1958) – Alistair Fury series, Grizzly Tales for Gruesome Kids series
Keith Robertson (1914–1991) – Henry Reed series
Hilary Robinson (born 1962) – Mixed Up Fairy Tales, Where The Poppies Now Grow
Joan G. Robinson (1910–1988) – Teddy Robinson series, When Marnie Was There
Gary D. Robson (born 1958) – Who Pooped? series
Gianni Rodari (1920–1980) – Telephone Tales (Favole al telefono), Tales Told by a Machine (Novelle fatte a macchina)
Emily Rodda (born 1948) – Fairy Realm series, Rowan of Rin series, Deltora Quest series
Don Roff (born 1966) – Scary Stories
Malcolm Rose (born 1953) – Traces series, Lawless and Tilley series
Simon Rose (born 1961) – The Alchemist's Portrait, The Sorcerer's Letterbox, The Clone Conspiracy, The Emerald Curse, The Heretic's Tomb
Michael Rosen (born 1946) – Sad Book, Fantastically Funny Stories, Quick, Let's Get Out of Here, We're Going on a Bear Hunt
Amy Krouse Rosenthal – Duck! Rabbit!
Meg Rosoff (born 1956) – How I Live Now, Just In Case, There Is No Dog, Picture Me Gone
Diana Ross (1910–2000) – The Little Red Engine series
Miriam Roth (1910–2005) – A Tale of Five Balloons
Veronica Roth (born 1988) – Divergent, Insurgent, Allegiant
J. K. Rowling (born 1965) – Harry Potter series
Hemendra Kumar Roy (1888–1963) – Bimal-Kumar series
Ron Roy (born 1940) – A to Z Mysteries, Capital Mysteries
Gillian Rubinstein (born 1942) – Space Demons, Galax-Arena
Katherine Rundell (born 1987) – The Girl Savage, Rooftoppers
Salman Rushdie (born 1947) – Haroun and the Sea of Stories
Rachel Renee Russell (born 1959) – Dork Diaries
An Rutgers van der Loeff (1910–1990) – Children on the Oregon Trail, Avalanche!
Chris Ryan (born 1961) – Alpha Force series
Pam Muñoz Ryan (born 1951) – Esperanza Rising, Becoming Naomi León
Cynthia Rylant (born 1954) – Missing May, Henry and Mudge series, Poppleton series

S

Louis Sachar (born 1954) – Sideways Stories From Wayside School series, Holes
Angie Sage (born 1952) – Septimus Heap series
Antoine de Saint-Exupéry (1900–1944) – The Little Prince
Emilio Salgari (1862–1911) – The Tigers of Mompracem, The Black Corsair
Felix Salten (1869–1945) – Bambi 
Carl Sandburg (1878–1967) – Rootabaga Stories
Brandon Sanderson (born 1975) – Alcatraz Versus the Evil Librarians
Margaret Marshall Saunders (1861–1947) – Beautiful Joe
Constance Savery (1897–1999) – Enemy Brothers
Malcolm Saville (1901–1982) – Lone Pine Club series
Ruth Sawyer (1880–1970) – Roller Skates
Allen Say (born 1937) – Grandfather's Journey, The Ink-Keeper's Apprentice
Kurtis Scaletta – Mudville, Mamba Point, The Tanglewood Terror
Richard Scarry (1919–1994) – Busytown series
Annet Schaap (born 1965) – Lampje
Pam Scheunemann (born 1955) – Overdue Kangaroo, Ape Cape, The Crane Loves Grain
Jon Scieszka (born 1954) – The Time Warp Trio, The True Story of the 3 Little Pigs!, Science Verse
Miriam Schlein (1926–2004) – The Year of the Panda, I, Tut, The Way Mothers Are
Mark Schlichting (born 1948) – Harry and the Haunted House
Laura Amy Schlitz (born 1955) – Good Masters! Sweet Ladies! Voices from a Medieval Village
Christoph von Schmid (1768–1854) – The Basket of Flowers, Easter Eggs
Annie M. G. Schmidt (1911–1995) – Jip and Janneke, Abeltje,  Pluk van de Petteflet
Alvin Schwartz (1927–1992) – Scary Stories to Tell in the Dark
Ann Scott-Moncrieff (1914–1943) – Aboard the Bulger, Auntie Robbo
Michael Scott (born 1959) – The Secrets of the Immortal Nicholas Flamel series
Will Scott (1893–1964) – The Cherrys series
Laura Vaccaro Seeger – First the Egg, Green
Countess of Ségur (1799–1874) – Sophie's Misfortunes, Good Little Girls, Monsieur Cadichon: Memoirs of a Donkey
Tor Seidler (born 1952) – A Rat's Tale, The Wainscott Weasel, Mean Margaret
George Selden (1929–1989) – The Cricket in Times Square series
Maurice Sendak (1928–2012) – Where the Wild Things Are
Kate Seredy (1896–1975) – The White Stag, The Good Master, The Singing Tree
Ernest Thompson Seton (1860–1946) – Wild Animals I Have Known, Bannertail, Two Little Savages
Dr. Seuss (1904–1991) – The Cat in the Hat, Green Eggs and Ham, How the Grinch Stole Christmas!
David Severn (1918–2010) – Ponies and Poachers, Dream Gold, The Future Took Us
Anna Sewell (1820–1878) – Black Beauty
Elizabeth Missing Sewell (1815–1906) – Amy Herbert
Miranda Seymour (born 1948) – Mumtaz the Magical Cat
Evelyn Sharp (1869–1955) – All the Way to Fairyland, The Other Side of the Sun
Margery Sharp (1905–1991) – The Rescuers
Mark Shasha (born 1961) – Night of the Moonjellies
Charles Green Shaw (1892–1974) – It Looked Like Spilt Milk
Jane Shaw (1910–2000) – Susan Pulls the Strings
Mary Shelley (1797–1851) – Maurice, or the Fisher's Cot
Dorothy Sherrill (1901–1990) – The Story of a Little Gray Mouse
Mary Martha Sherwood (1775–1851) – The History of Little Henry and his Bearer, The History of the Fairchild Family
Gary Shipman (born 1966) and Rhoda Shipman (born 1968) – Pakkins' Land
Mark Shulman (born 1962) – Scrawl, Mom and Dad are Palindromes, Secret Hiding Places
Henryk Sienkiewicz (1846–1916) – In Desert and Wilderness
Yrsa Sigurðardóttir (born 1963) – We Want Christmas in July, Biobörn
Shel Silverstein (1930–1999) – The Giving Tree, Where the Sidewalk Ends
Francesca Simon (born 1955) – Horrid Henry series
Seymour Simon (born 1931) – Einstein Anderson, Science Detective
Catherine Sinclair (1800–1864) – Holiday House: A Book for the Young
Lester Basil Sinclair (1894–1974) – Why Cows Moo
Isaac Bashevis Singer (1902–1991) – Zlateh the Goat and Other Stories, A Day of Pleasure, The Golem
Marilyn Singer (born 1948) – Turtle in July
S. Sivadas (born 1940) – Rasatantra Kathakal, Pustaka Kalikal
Steve Skidmore  (born 1960) and Steve Barlow – Outernet series
Obert Skye – Leven Thumps series
Ioan Slavici  (1848–1925) – The Fairy Aurora, The Twins with the Golden Star
Arthur Slade (born 1967) – Dust, The Hunchback Assignments
William Sleator (1945–2011) – Singularity, Rewind
Barbara Sleigh (1906–1982) – Carbonel series, Jessamy, No One Must Know, The Snowball
Dodie Smith (1896–1990) – The Hundred and One Dalmatians
Edward Wyke Smith (1871–1935) – The Marvellous Land of Snergs
Georgina Castle Smith (1845–1933) – Froggy's Little Brother
Roland Smith (born 1951) – Thunder Cave, Peak, Cryptid Hunters
Barbara Smucker (1915–2003) – Underground to Canada, Days of Terror

Pat Smythe (1928–1996) – Three Jays series, Adventure series
Caroline Snedeker (1871–1956) – Downright Dencey, The Forgotten Daughter
Lemony Snicket (born 1970) – A Series of Unfortunate Events
Jack Snow (1907–1956) – The Magical Mimics in Oz, The Shaggy Man of Oz
Laurel Snyder – Up and Down the Scratchy Mountains, Any Which Wall, Penny Dreadful
Zilpha Keatley Snyder (1927–2014) – The Egypt Game, The Headless Cupid, The Witches of Worm
Donald J. Sobol (1924–2012) – Encyclopedia Brown series, Two-Minute Mysteries series
Angela Sommer-Bodenburg (born 1948) – The Little Vampire series
Virginia Sorenson (1912–1991) – Miracles on Maple Hill
Ivan Southall (1921–2008) – Josh, Ash Road, Hills End, To the Wild Sky, Bread and Honey, Fly West
Stephen Southwold (1887–1964) – Fiddlededee: A Medley of Stories
Elizabeth George Speare (1908–1994) – The Witch of Blackbird Pond, The Bronze Bow, The Sign of the Beaver
Armstrong Sperry (1897–1976) – Call It Courage
Peter Spier (1927–2017) – Noah's Ark
Jerry Spinelli (born 1941) – Loser, Stargirl, Maniac Magee, Crash, Wringer
Nancy Springer (born 1948) – The Enola Holmes Mysteries, Tales of Rowan Hood
E. C. Spykman (1896–1965) – A Lemon and a Star, The Wild Angel, Terrible Horrible Edie, Edie on the Warpath
Johanna Spyri (1827–1901) – Heidi
Andy Stanton (born 1973) – Mr Gum series
Dugald Steer (born 1965) – Ologies series
William Steig (1907–2003) – Sylvester and the Magic Pebble, Doctor De Soto, Shrek!
John Steptoe (1950–1989) – Stevie, Mufaro's Beautiful Daughters
Robin Stevens (born 1988) – Murder Most Unladylike
Robert Louis Stevenson (1850–1894) – A Child's Garden of Verses, Treasure Island, Kidnapped
Jennifer J. Stewart – If That Breathes Fire, We're Toast!, Close Encounters of a Third World Kind
Mary Stewart (1916–2014) – The Little Broomstick, Ludo and the Star Horse, A Walk in Wolf Wood
Paul Stewart (born 1955) – The Edge Chronicles, Fergus Crane, Muddle Earth, Barnaby Grimes
R. L. Stine (born 1943) – Goosebumps, Fear Street, The Nightmare Room series
Frank R. Stockton (1834–1902) – The Lady, or the Tiger?
Hilda van Stockum (1908–2006) – A Day on Skates, The Winged Watchman
Margaret Storey – Timothy and the Two Witches, The Stone Sorcerer, Pauline
Walter Scott Story (1879–1955) – Skinny Harrison Adventurer
Herbert Strang (1866–1958) – Round the World in Seven Days, King of the Air, Rob the Ranger
Todd Strasser (born 1950) – Help! I'm Trapped... series
Edward Stratemeyer (1862–1930) – founder of the Stratemeyer Syndicate that produced many series, most famously Rover Boys (by Stratemeyer as Arthur M. Winfield), Bobbsey Twins, Tom Swift, Hardy Boys, and Nancy Drew
Noel Streatfeild (1895–1986) – Ballet Shoes, The Circus Is Coming, Curtain Up, White Boots, The Painted Garden (US titles Circus Shoes, Theater Shoes, Skating Shoes, Movie Shoes)
Jakob Streit (1910–2009) – Liputto: Stories of Gnomes and Trolls
Hesba Stretton (1832–1911) – Jessica's First Prayer
Agnes Strickland (1796–1874) – Tales from English History for Children, The Rival Crusoes
Charles S. Strong (1906–1962) – The Hooded Hawk Mystery, The Scarlet Slipper Mystery, Snow King: Herd Dog of Lapland
Jeremy Strong (born 1949) – There's a Viking in My Bed
Jonathan Stroud (born 1970) – The Bartimaeus Trilogy, Lockwood & Co.
Dorothy Margaret Stuart (1889–1963) – The Children's Chronicle, The Young Clavengers
Sheila Stuart (1892–1984) – Alison's Highland Holiday
Jennifer Sullivan (born 1945) – The Magic Apostrophe, Gwydion and the Flying Wand
Deirdre Sullivan – Tangleweed and Brine, Prim Improper
Rosemary Sutcliff (1920–1992) – The Eagle of the Ninth, The Lantern Bearers, The Mark of the Horse Lord, Black Ships Before Troy
Jón Sveinsson (1857–1944) – Nonni series 
Jonathan Swift (1667–1745) – Gulliver's Travels

T

Rajesh Talwar (born 1958) – The Three Greens
Shaun Tan (born 1974) – The Red Tree, The Lost Thing, Tales from Outer Suburbia, Rules of Summer
Kathryn Tanquary – The Night Parade
Ann Taylor (1782–1866) and Jane Taylor (1783–1824) – Rhymes for the Nursery, Original Poems for Infant Minds, Little Ann and Other Poems
Dorota Terakowska (1938–2004) – Córka czarownicy
K. Thayat (1927–2011) – Mela, Naivedyam
Colin Thiele (1920–2006) – Storm Boy, Blue Fin, Sun on the Stubble
Scarlett Thomas (born 1972) – Worldquake series
Kate Thompson (born 1956) – Switchers, The New Policeman
Ruth Plumly Thompson (1891–1976) – The Royal Book of Oz (1921) and twenty subsequent Oz books
James Thurber (1894–1961) – The Thirteen Clocks, The Wonderful O, Many Moons
Tim Tingle — Crossing Bok Chitto: A Choctaw Tale of Friendship and Freedom
Eve Titus (1905–2002) – Basil of Baker Street series, Anatole series
Ada Josephine Todd (1858–1904) – The Vacation Club
Barbara Euphan Todd (1890–1976) – Worzel Gummidge series
H. E. Todd (1908–1988) – Bobby Brewster series
J. R. R. Tolkien (1892–1973) – The Hobbit, The Father Christmas Letters
Aleksei Nikolaevich Tolstoy (1883–1945) – The Golden Key, or the Adventures of Buratino
Leo Tolstoy (1828–1910) – Classic Tales and Fables for Children
Theresa Tomlinson (born 1946) – The Forestwife, Meet Me by the Steelmen, The Moon Riders
Hazel Townson (1928–2010) – The Deathwood Letters, The Speckled Panic, The Invisible Boy
Catharine Parr Traill (1802–1899) – Canadian Crusoes
Nigel Tranter (1909–2000) – Spaniard's Isle, Nestor the Monster
P. L. Travers (1899–1986) – Mary Poppins series
Mary Treadgold (1910–2005) – We Couldn't Leave Dinah
Geoffrey Trease (1909–1998) – Cue for Treason, The Hills of Varna
Henry Treece (1911–1966) – Horned Helmet, The Road to Miklagard, The Children's Crusade
Sharon Tregenza (born 1951) – Tarantula Tide, The Shiver Stone
Meriol Trevor (1919–2000) – Merlin's Ring, The Other Side of the Moon, The Rose Round, The King of the Castle, The Letzenstein Chronicles
John R. Tunis (1889–1975) – Iron Duke, All American, Keystone Kids, The Kid from Tomkinsville
Ann Turnbull (born 1943) – Pigeon Summer, The Sand Horse, No Shame, No Fear
Ethel Turner (1872–1958) – Seven Little Australians
Julian Tuwim (1894–1953) – "The Locomotive" and other poems for children, 
Mark Twain (1835–1910) – The Adventures of Tom Sawyer, The Adventures of Huckleberry Finn

U
Tomi Ungerer (1931–2019) – The Mellops series, Moon Man, Flix 
Florence Kate Upton (1873–1922) – The Adventures of Two Dutch Dolls and a Golliwogg
Anne Ursu – The Cronus Chronicles
Else Ury (1877–1943) – Nesthäkchen and Her Dolls, Nesthäkchen and the World War
Eduard Uspensky (1937–2018) – Crocodile Gena and His Friends, Uncle Fedya, His Dog, and His Cat
Alison Uttley (1884–1976) – Little Grey Rabbit series, A Traveller in Time

V

Rachel Vail (born 1966) – Wonder, Do-Over, The Friendship Ring series
Jenny Valentine – Finding Violet Park, Broken Soup
Chris Van Allsburg (born 1949) – Jumanji, The Polar Express, The Garden of Abdul Gasazi
Wendelin Van Draanen (born 1965) – Sammy Keyes series, Flipped
Hendrik Willem van Loon (1882–1944) – The Story of Mankind (nonfiction)
Shreekumar Varma (born 1955) – The Royal Rebel
Amy Cripps Vernon (1870–1956) – Gerald's Chum
Heiki Vilep (born 1960) – The Sounds of Silence, The Monsters of the Closet Door
Rene Villanueva (1954–2007) – Ang Unang Baboy Sa Langit (The First Pig In Heaven)
Judith Viorst (born 1931) – Alexander and the Terrible, Horrible, No Good, Very Bad Day
Elfrida Vipont (1902–1992) – The Lark in the Morn, The Lark on the Wing, The Elephant and the Bad Baby
John Vornholt (born 1951) – The Troll King series
Anne de Vries (1904–1964) – Journey Through the Night
Seita Vuorela (1971–2015) – The School of Possibilities, Karikko

W

Bernard Waber (1921–2013) – The House on East 88th Street
Muriel Wace (1881–1968) – Moorland Mousie
Lea Wait (born 1946) – Stopping to Home, Wintering Well
Judy Waite – Mouse Look Out
Priscilla Wakefield (1751–1832) – The Juvenile Travellers: Containing the Remarks of A Family During a Tour Through the Principal States and Kingdoms of Europe
Dorothy Wall (1894–1942) – Blinky Bill
Ivy Wallace (1915–2006) – Pookie series, The Animal Shelf series
Nancy Elizabeth Wallace (born 1948) – Snow 
John Graham Wallace (born 1966) – Mr Bumble
Maria Elena Walsh (1930–2011) – Tutú Marambá
Vivian Walsh – Olive, the Other Reindeer, Gluey, Penguin Dreams, Mr. Lunch series
Mildred Pitts Walter – Justin and the Best Biscuits in the World, Second Daughter: The Story of a Slave Girl
Amy Catherine Walton (Mrs. O. F. Walton, 1849–1939) – Christie's Old Organ
Jennifer Ward (born 1963) – Way Out in the Desert
Elizabeth Watkin-Jones (1887–1966) – Plant y Mynachdy, Onesimus 
Victor Watson (born 1936) – Paradise Barn series
Marion St John Webb (1888–1930) – Knock Three Times, The Girls of Chequertrees
Regina Webb (born 1980) – Detective Henry Hopper series
Sadie Rose Weilerstein (1894–1993) – The Adventures of K'tonton
Ronald Welch (1909–1982) – The Gauntlet, Knight Crusader
Jacqueline West (born 1979) – Dreamers Often Lie, The Books of Elsewhere 
Robert Westall (1929–1993) – The Machine Gunners, Fathom Five, The Scarecrows
Frank Atha Westbury (1838–1901) – Australian Fairy Tales
Scott Westerfeld (born 1963) – Midnighters trilogy, Peeps, The Last Days, Uglies series
John F. C. Westerman (1901–1991) – John Wentley Takes Charge, The Invisible Plane
Percy F. Westerman (1876–1959) – All Hands to the Boats, Deeds of Pluck and Daring in the Great War
Carol Weston (born 1956) – Melanie Martin series, Ava and Pip
Michael Wexler  – The Seems series
Suzanne Weyn (born 1955) – The Bar Code Tattoo, Mr. Magorium's Wonder Emporium
Gloria Whelan (born 1923) – Homeless Bird, Angel on the Square, Listening for Lions, Chu Ju's House 
Evelyn Whitaker (1844–1929) – Laddie, Tip Cat
E. B. White (1899–1985) – Charlotte's Web, Stuart Little, The Trumpet of the Swan
T. H. White (1906–1964) – The Sword in the Stone, Mistress Masham's Repose
Martin Widmark (born 1961) – The Whodunit Detective Agency series
Kate Douglas Wiggin (1856–1923) – Rebecca of Sunnybrook Farm
Oscar Wilde (1854–1900) – The Selfish Giant, The Happy Prince and Other Stories
Laura Ingalls Wilder (1867–1957) – Little House on the Prairie and other Little House books
Geoffrey Willans (1911–1958) – Down with Skool, How to Be Topp
Barbara Willard (1909–1994) – The Iron Lily
John Ellis Williams (1924–2008) – Owen the Goat of Snowdon
Karen Lynn Williams (born 1952) – Galimoto
Maiya Williams (born 1962) – The Golden Hour
Margery Williams (1881–1944) – The Velveteen Rabbit, Poor Cecco, Winterbound
Oneeka Williams (born 1966) – Dr. Dee Dee Dynamo series, Not Even the Sky is the Limit 
Ursula Moray Williams (1911–2006) – Adventures of the Little Wooden Horse, Gobbolino the Witch's Cat
Rita Williams-Garcia (born 1957) – One Crazy Summer, P.S. Be Eleven, Gone Crazy in Alabama
Henry Williamson (1895–1977) – Tarka the Otter
Budge Wilson (1927–2021) – Before Green Gables, The Leaving
Jacqueline Wilson (born 1945) – Girls in Love, Double Act, The Story of Tracy Beaker, The Illustrated Mum
Jane Wilson-Howarth (born 1954) – Himalayan Kidnap, Chasing the Tiger
Arthur M. Winfield (Edward Stratemeyer pseudonym from 1899) – Rover Boys series
Henry Winkler (born 1945) – Hank Zipzer series
Henry Winterfeld (1901–1990) – Trouble at Timpetill, Detectives in Togas, Star Girl
Elizabeth Winthrop (born 1948) – The Castle in the Attic
Mary Wollstonecraft (1759–1797) – Original Stories from Real Life
Audrey Wood (born 1948) – The Napping House, Moonflute, King Bidgood's in the Bathtub
Patricia Wrede (born 1953) – Enchanted Forest Chronicles series
Dare Wright (1914–2001) – The Lonely Doll
Patricia Wrightson (1921–2010) – The Crooked Snake, The Nargun and the Stars
Eva-Lis Wuorio (1918–1988) – The Island of Fish in the Trees, The Happiness Flower
Johann David Wyss (1743–1818) – The Swiss Family Robinson

Y
Kelly Yang – Front Desk
Laurence Yep (born 1948) – The Golden Mountain Chronicles, Dragon series, Ribbons
Jane Yolen (born 1939) – Owl Moon, Commander Toad series, Pit Dragon series, Wizard's Hall
Charlotte Mary Yonge (1823–1901) – The Daisy Chain, The Little Duke, The Dove in the Eagle's Nest
E. H. Young (1880–1949) – Caravan Island, River Holiday
Ed Young (born 1931) – Lon Po Po, Seven Blind Mice
Miriam Young (1913–1974) – Miss Suzy, Jellybeans for Breakfast, A Witch's Garden

Z
Zheng Yuanjie (born 1955) – King of Fairy Tales
Paul Zindel (1936–2003) – The Pigman
Feenie Ziner (1921–2012) – Squanto, The Book of Time
Charlotte Zolotow (1915–2013) – Mr. Rabbit and the Lovely Present
Rania Zaghir (born 1977) – Who Ate My Ice Cream?

See also

Caldecott Medal
Carnegie Medal
Children's literature
Fairy tale
Newbery Medal
Young adult literature
List of American children's books
List of children's book illustrators
List of children's classic books
List of children's non-fiction writers
List of fairy tales
List of young adult authors
Lists of writers

References

External links

Vintage Series Books for Girls ... and a Few for Boys

 
Children's authors